He Xiangdong (born February 1964) is a Chinese diplomat and currently the Chinese Ambassador to Ireland.

Biography
He was born in Hunan in February 1964, while his ancestral home in Wuyi County, Zhejiang. In September 1981, he entered Wuhan University, majoring in economics, where he graduated in July 1985.

After university, he worked as a journalist at World Knowledge. In September 1989, he was accepted to China Foreign Affairs University. After graduating in July 1991, he returned to his former work unit, the World Knowledge magazine. He was second secretary at Chinese Embassy in Oman from October 1994 to July 1996 and second secretary then first secretary at Chinese Embassy in Saudi Arabia from July 1996 to November 1999. He returned to China in November 1999, when he was appointed director and first secretary of the Political Research Department of the Ministry of Foreign Affairs. In June 2004 he was promoted to become counsellor of the Chinese Embassy in the United States, a position he held until August 2012. He became vice-mayor and member of the Standing Committee of the CPC Lanzhou Municipal Committee in March 2014, and served until September 2016.

In September 2016, he was granted his first ambassadorship as Chinese Ambassador to South Sudan. He served from 2016 through 2019. In May 2019 he was appointed Chinese Ambassador to Ireland in succession to Yue Xiaoyong.

References

External links
  Curriculum Vitae of Ambassador He Xiangdong

1964 births
Living people
People from Jinhua
Wuhan University alumni
China Foreign Affairs University alumni
Ambassadors of China to South Sudan
Ambassadors of China to Ireland